|}

The Bunbury Cup is a flat handicap horse race in Great Britain open to horses aged three years or older. It is run on the July Course at Newmarket over a distance of 7 furlongs (1,408 metres), and it is scheduled to take place each year in July.

The event is named in honour of Sir Charles Bunbury (1740–1821), who served as the Senior Steward of the Jockey Club. He introduced both of the Classics held at Newmarket, the 1,000 Guineas and the 2,000 Guineas.

The Bunbury Cup is contested on the final day of Newmarket's three-day July Festival meeting.

Records

Most successful horse since 1962 (3 wins):
 Mine – 2002, 2005, 2006

Leading jockey since 1962 (7 wins):
 Lester Piggott – Showoff (1966), Red Mask (1972), Pitskelly (1974), Paterno (1982), Mummy's Pleasure (1983), En Attendant (1993, 1994)

Leading trainer since 1962 (3 wins):
 Michael Jarvis – Pitskelly (1974), Fedoria (1990), Savoyard (1991)
 James Bethell – Mine (2002, 2005, 2006)
 Richard Fahey - Brae Hill (2011), Heaven's Guest (2014), Rene Mathis (2015)

Winners since 1962
 Weights given in stones and pounds.

See also
 Horse racing in Great Britain
 List of British flat horse races

References
 Paris-Turf:

 Racing Post:
 racenewsonline.co.uk – Racenews Archive (10 July 2008).

Flat races in Great Britain
Newmarket Racecourse
Open mile category horse races